The Lodi Crushers were a collegiate woodbat baseball team based in Lodi, California. They were charter members of the Great West League and played their home games at Tony Zupo Field in Lodi. The team was owned by Wine Country Baseball and was run by general manager Doug Leary. They were named for the original California League minor league franchise now known as the Rancho Cucamonga Quakes.

The team has gone dormant for 2017.

References

External links
 Lodi Crushers official website
 Great West League website

Amateur baseball teams in California
Lodi, California
2015 establishments in California
Baseball teams established in 2015
Defunct baseball teams in California
Baseball teams disestablished in 2016